Secret Superstar is a 2017 Indian Hindi-language musical drama film written and directed by Advait Chandan, and produced by Aamir Khan and Kiran Rao under the studio Aamir Khan Productions. The film stars Zaira Wasim, Aamir Khan, Meher Vij and Raj Arjun. The film tells the coming-of-age story of a teenage girl who aspires to be a singer, uploading videos on YouTube while disguising her identity with a niqab, and her relationships with her mother, father and mentor. The film deals with social issues including feminism, gender equality and domestic violence.
The film received overall positive reviews from critics. Wasim won the National Child Award for Exceptional Achievement. Secret Superstar received ten nominations at the 63rd Filmfare Awards, including Best Film, Best Director for Chandan, Best Actress for Wasim, and Best Supporting Actor for Khan. It won three Filmfare Awards, including Best Actress (Critics) for Wasim, Best Supporting Actress for Vij, and Best Playback Singer (Female) for Meghna Mishra.

The film is also the highest-grossing Indian film featuring a female protagonist, the highest-grossing 2017 Hindi film, the seventh highest-grossing Indian film worldwide, and the second highest-grossing Indian film overseas. In China, it is the fifth highest-grossing foreign film of 2018, and the second highest-grossing non-English foreign film ever (after Dangal).

Plot 

Insia Malik, a 15-year-old girl, lives with her Muslim family in Baroda: her mother Najma, her brother Guddu, her paternal grandmother, and her abusive father Farookh, who often beats his wife. Insia is very passionate about singing but her father is against her dream of being a singer.

She records a song wearing a niqab, so Farookh can't find out her identity, and uploads the video on YouTube under the name of 'Secret Superstar' using the laptop gifted by Najma. She becomes an overnight sensation and grabs the attention of Shakti Kumar, a talented but pretentious music director based in Mumbai. He requests Insia to record a song, but she refuses as she hears a lot of negative reviews of him. Due to her poor academic grades, Farookh rips out all the strings from her guitar.

The next night, after discovering that Najma sold a valuable necklace to buy Insia's laptop, Farookh thrashes her and tells Insia to throw out the laptop. Insia gets so angry that she snatches the laptop and drops it from the balcony where it falls and shatters on the street. Insia persuades Kumar to arrange a meeting with his ex-wife's lawyer. The lawyer prepares papers for Najma to sign, and gives them to Insia. After fleeing from school to record a song for Kumar, she is unable to sing a certain party song. Insia tells this to Kumar who reveals that it is a remix. He tells her about the original version which was launched ten years ago. After singing the original song, her fame grows and she is nominated for the Best Female Singer.

Insia gives her mother divorce papers to sign, but her mother angrily rejects Insia's demand that her parents divorce. Insia becomes frustrated with her mother, but later forgives her, after her grandmother reveals how Najma struggled to keep Insia alive. Farookh is offered a job in Riyadh and he makes it known to Insia that he plans to marry her off to his friend's son. Devastated, Insia gives up her dream of singing and deletes her YouTube channel. Farookh confirms their departure on the last day of Insia's exams.

At the airport, Farookh spots Insia's guitar case. Unwilling to pay the extra fee for the case, he demands that Insia throw the guitar in the nearest trash can. After initially holding back her emotions, Najma finally stands up for herself and boldly protests. Najma then unpacks the divorce papers, signs them, and thrusts them into Farookh's hands. Najma says her goodbyes to Farookhs' mother (Insia and Guddu's grandmother) and storms out of the airport with her kids in tow leaving Farookh yelling and pounding his fists behind airport security doors. Najma borrows a stranger's cell phone and asks Insia to contact Kumar. All three ultimately end up at the awards ceremony where Insia has been nominated for Best Female Singer. Unfortunately, Insia does not win the award. But the winner, Monali Thakur, graciously offers Insia her award believing she rightfully deserved it. Kumar stands up and calls attention to Insia's presence in the audience. Once onstage, Insia dedicates her award to her mother and proclaims her the true 'Secret Superstar' since Najma supported and fought for Insia even before her birth.

The screen fades to a message dedicating the movie "To Mothers And Motherhood." Later, Shakti releases a cheesy party song on YouTube dedicated to Insia.

Cast 
 Zaira Wasim as Insia
 Aamir Khan as Shakti Kumaarr
 Meher Vij as Najma
 Raj Arjun as Farookh
 Farrukh Jaffar as Badi Apa
 Tirth Sharma as Chintan
 Kabir Sajid as Guddu
 Mona Ambegaonkar as Sheena Sabavala
 Manuj Sharma as Ranjeet
 Nitika Anand Mukherjee as Sheetal Miss
 Shaan as himself (cameo)
 Monali Thakur as herself (cameo)

Production

Development 
Chandan conceived of the film during the first season of Aamir Khan's television talk show Satyamev Jayate. While doing the research on the episode about domestic violence, Advait Chandan came across Shanno, a single mother and a victim of domestic abuse. After her husband died, Shanno decided to join a driving school and become a driver so as to run her house, a decision that had the full support of her daughter who was willing to work as a maid so that her mother could go and learn driving. Shanno was successful in becoming a driver and through that she managed to support her house. This story redefined the word hero for Advait Chandan who says, "That is when I realised that my idea of a hero was really narrow. Shanno’s daughter is the real hero here. The definition of a hero for me and what I was writing about, it totally changed at that moment."

During the third season of Satyamev Jayate, the first episode narrated the success story of ten year old Shubham Jaglan, son of a milkman and the youngest golf champion of India. Shubham revealed that he learned 60 per cent of Golf through YouTube videos. The story of Shubham further helped Advait Chandan in the development of his film Secret Superstar. Advait says that, "I feel like the middle class is really getting affected by the internet. I never went to film school, but I can sit here and watch a lesson on Stanley Kubrick’s camera movements, for example. The internet is empowering the middle class in a way that really needed to be captured on film. That was the umbrella idea—a mother and daughter in middle-class, small-town India getting empowered by this amazing tool that is giving platform to talent."

In July 2015 it was reported that Aamir Khan shall be collaborating with his manager Advait Chandan and music composer A. R. Rahman for a film that was initially titled Aaj Phir Jeene Ki Tamanna Hai. In late April 2016, the title of the film was said to be Secret Superstar. A.R. Rahman later opted out of the film, citing schedule conflicts. He was replaced by Amit Trivedi.

Casting and filming 
Aamir Khan had cast Zaira Wasim, when she was aged 14, in Dangal (2016). Shortly afterwards, Advait told Khan that he was looking for a girl of a similar age for the lead role of his film Secret Superstar, and Khan suggested Wasim. After Advait tested her, he was impressed and cast her in the lead role.

The principal photography of the film commenced on 1 September 2016. The film is shot in Vadodara and Mumbai.

The film was produced with a limited budget.

Release

India 
Secret Superstar was originally set to release on 4 August 2017, but it was later postponed to 19 October 2017. The film released in 1,100 theatres with 1,800 screens in India, and opened on 2,840 screens worldwide. The film made its Indian television debut on Zee Cinema, airing on 2425 February 2018 in India.

Overseas 
The film released in Taiwan on 24 November 2017, on 73 screens, more than Dangal. It was also announced that Secret Superstar would release in Russia, on 50 screens. The film was released in Russia on 8 February 2018. The same month, it was announced that there are plans to release the film in Japan, South Korea, and Hong Kong. The film had a theatrical release in the Philippines on 31 March 2018. In Japan, the film released on 9 August 2019.

China 
Aamir Khan announced in late October 2017 that he would be planning to release Secret Superstar in China over the next one or two months. The film released in China on 19 January 2018. It is the first Indian film to have a revenue-sharing deal, which is usually reserved for big Hollywood films. Khan's share of Chinese box office revenue will be 25%, compared to his 12.5% share for Dangal. Secret Superstar was released on 11,000 screens in China.

Secret Superstars China premiere was in Beijing on 16 January 2018, and was attended by director Advait Chandan, actress Zaira Wasim, and singer Meghna Mishra. Khan could not attend, but planned to visit China shortly after the film's release. The premiere was also attended by Chinese filmmakers such as Peter Chan, Tsai Yueh Hsun, Daming Chen, and Zhang Jiajia, and Chinese actors such as the Luu Brothers. The film's reception at the premiere was positive, which includes Hong Kong filmmaker Peter Chan calling it his second-favourite Indian film after 3 Idiots (2009), and writer-director Zhang Jiajia being impressed with the film's theme of empowering women to pursue their dreams. Upon release, the film was promoted with a manhua comic featuring Aamir Khan with the same title as the film.

Khan began his tour of China on 22 January 2018, and was greeted by film star Deng Chao upon arrival. He visited Shanghai, where he was welcomed by large crowds of fans. He then visited Beijing, where he attended the "Red Carpet for Aamir Khan and His Friends" event with Chandan and Wasim, then the Chinese-Indian Film Forum, and the film's press conference. The Chinese-Indian Film Forum, held by CCTV, was attended by a number of Chinese directors, stars, and film critics, including Chinese filmmaker Yu Baimei and Hong Kong filmmaker Stanley Tong, as well as former Olympic champion Liu Guoliang with whom Khan played a competitive ping pong (table tennis) match. Khan was also greeted by actor-singer Huang Bo, as well as other film stars including Liu Yifei and Jackie Chan in video messages.

Hong Kong 
The film released in Hong Kong on 12 April 2018. On 15 April 2018, Aamir Khan arrived in Hong Kong for promotions. Khan and Zaira Wasim attended a promotional event with Hong Kong film star Andy Lau, who Khan has often been compared to by Chinese media. Khan and Wasim also attended the 37th Hong Kong Film Awards, where Khan presented the Best Actor award to actor Louis Koo. On 16 April 2018, Khan attended an event at the University of Hong Kong along with Cantopop singer Kay Tse, who later also attended the film's premiere.

Music 

The music of the film was composed by Amit Trivedi while the lyrics of the film were written by Kausar Munir. The album has eight tracks, with five of them being sung by Meghna Mishra. Mika Singh, Sunidhi Chauhan and Kushal Chokshi sang one song each. The music video of the song "Main Kaun Hoon" was released on 23 August 2017. The full soundtrack album was released on 21 September 2017.

Initially, Aamir Khan approached A. R. Rahman to compose music for the film. Prasoon Joshi was signed as the lyricist, thus reuniting the trio after Rang De Basanti and Ghajini. But once the production was delayed, Rahman and Prasoon Joshi opted out of the project citing scheduling conflicts.

Chinese versions 
For the film's China release, a Mandarin Chinese version of the song "Main Kaun Hoon" was sung by actor-singer Huang Bo. He was previously Aamir Khan's voice actor for the Mandarin dub of 3 Idiots.

For the film's Hong Kong release, a Cantonese version of "Nachdi Phira" has been sung by Cantopop star Kay Tse. The Cantonese version of the song is entitled "Ko Sing Yue Cho" and was released digitally on 11 April 2018.

Box office 
The film is also the highest-grossing Indian film featuring a female protagonist, the highest-grossing 2017 Hindi film, the fourth highest-grossing Indian film worldwide, and the second highest-grossing Indian film overseas. In China, it is the fifth highest-grossing foreign film of 2018, and the second highest-grossing non-English foreign film ever (after Dangal).

Compared to its limited budget, Secret Superstar became one of the most profitable films of all time. In comparison, only two films have exceeded $6,000% ROI at the US box office, Paranormal Activity (2009) and The Gallows (2015).

It is the highest-grossing 2017 Hindi film, and the third-highest-grossing Hindi film of all time, behind only Dangal (2016) and Bajrangi Bhaijaan (2015). It is also the fourth-highest-grossing Indian film of all time, behind only Dangal, Baahubali 2: The Conclusion (2017) and Bajrangi Bhaijaan (2015), after surpassing Aamir Khan's own PK (2014). With Secret Superstar, Aamir Khan has become the only Indian actor with four films in the 500-crore club, after Dhoom 3 (2013), PK, and Dangal (2016), as well as the only Indian actor with three  grossers, after PK and Dangal. Secret Superstar grossed  worldwide by 27 February 2018.

India 
Secret Superstar grossed  in its first week in India. The film grossed over  after ten days at the domestic Indian box office. By the end of 2017, the film grossed  in India.

It was declared a hit at the Indian box office, and is domestically one of 2017's five most commercially successful Bollywood films, along with Tiger Zinda Hai, Golmaal Again, Raees, and Badrinath Ki Dulhania.

Overseas 
Secret Superstar grossed US$2.8 million overseas in its first weekend, performing well in unconventional markets, entering the top four in Turkey and the top ten in the United Kingdom. The film's overseas gross in its opening weekend was US$2,116,565 in the United Kingdom, United States, Canada, Arab states of the Persian Gulf, Australia and Pakistan. The film grossed US$468,276 in Turkey, as of 19 November 2017, surpassing Dangals performance in Turkey. In the United Kingdom, Secret Superstar grossed £500,000 (US$) by 30 October 2017, and grossed  as of 26 November 2017. By 22 November 2017, the film had grossed US$6.48 million overseas.

In Taiwan, where it released on 24 November 2017, the film grossed US$285,000 in five days, which is 77% of the amount that Dangal grossed in its first five days there, as of 29 November 2017. The film entered at number three on the Taiwan box office charts. Excluding China, the film has grossed  in other overseas territories as of 28 January 2018.

During its opening weekend in China, the film's overseas gross reached  by 21 January 2018. It established Aamir Khan as the only Indian actor with five films crossing  overseas, after 3 Idiots (2009), Dhoom 3 (2013), PK (2014), and Dangal (2016). During its opening weekend in China, Secret Superstar emerged as the weekend's highest-grossing film in a single international market, and the second-highest-grossing film overall at the worldwide box office, behind only Jumanji: Welcome to the Jungle (in 93 markets), and above other Hollywood films such as Star Wars: The Last Jedi, Insidious: The Last Key, and Maze Runner: The Death Cure. In its second weekend, Secret Superstar remained the second-highest-grossing film at the international box office, behind Maze Runner and ahead of Jumanji. By 8 February 2018, Secret Superstar grossed  overseas, establishing Aamir Khan as the only Indian actor with two  overseas grossers. It is the highest-grossing 2017 Indian film overseas, surpassing Tiger Zinda Hai and Baahubali 2: The Conclusion, and the second-highest-grossing Indian film ever overseas, surpassing PK and behind only Dangal.

China 
In China, the film earned  in ticket presales by 15 January 2018. Upon release on 19 January 2018, Secret Superstar topped the Chinese box office with a 25.3% market share, followed by Zhang Ziyi starrer Forever Young with a 16% share. By the end of its opening day, Secret Suparstar had grossed , surpassing Dangals  opening to become the biggest debut for an Indian film. The film grossed  on its second day, remaining at the top of the box office.

It topped the Chinese box office in its opening weekend, despite crowded competition, from Chinese films such as Forever Young and A Better Tomorrow 2018 as well as Hollywood films such as Ferdinand, Wonder, Jumanji: Welcome to the Jungle and Star Wars: The Last Jedi. Secret Superstars opening weekend gross in China more than doubled its lifetime gross in India. It set the record for the highest opening weekend gross for an Indian film in China, surpassing Dangal, and is the second Indian film in less than a year to top the Chinese box office, after Dangal. Secret Superstar also became the second-highest-grossing Indian film in China, surpassing PK and behind only Dangal. Secret Superstars weekend gross in China is also the highest single-territory weekend gross for a 2017 Hindi film, surpassing the opening-weekend India gross of Tiger Zinda Hai and the Hindi version of Baahubali 2: The Conclusion.

In four days, the film grossed $33million in China. On its fifth day, its daily show count increased to over 64,000 screenings, and it gained a 33.7% market share of the Chinese box office. In six days, the film grossed $43million, surpassing the lifetime China gross of Star Wars: The Last Jedi. Secret Superstars first-week gross in China was $47.1million, a record for an Indian film and surpassing the first-week gross of Avatar (2009) in China. On its second Friday, new Hollywood release Maze Runner: The Death Cure took the top spot, before Secret Superstar regained the top spot on Sunday, grossing $20million in its second weekend. It crossed the  milestone within nine days, and beat Maze Runner to top the weekly box office with $41million, giving a cume of $70million grossed in ten days by 28 January 2018, compared to Dangal which grossed  in two weeks. Secret Superstar grossed $77million in 13 days, surpassing the lifetime China gross of Dwayne Johnson starrer Jumanji: Welcome to the Jungle to become China's highest-grossing foreign film in the first quarter of 2018. In two weeks, Secret Superstar grossed $80million.

It topped the box office again in its third weekend with $12 million, beating seven new releases, including Hugh Jackman starrer The Greatest Showman, Chinese films Till the End of The World and Boonie Bears: The Big Shrink, and Japanese film Miracles of the Namiya General Store. Secret Superstar also topped the weekly chart again with $26 million, giving a cume of $96million grossed in 17 days by 4 February 2018. The film remained at the top of the box office in its fourth weekend with $8.7million, and it topped the weekly box office again with $19million. As of 18 February 2018, the film's China gross is $124.4million, from an audience of 25million viewers. It was China's third-highest-grossing film in the first quarter of 2018, behind only two domestic productions, and one of the top 70 highest-grossing films ever in China. It also surpassed Japanese anime film Your Name to become the second-highest-grossing non-English foreign film ever in China, after Dangal, and the third-highest-grossing non-English foreign film in any market, after Dangal in China and Crouching Tiger, Hidden Dragon (2000) in North America. Secret Superstar was also the highest-grossing foreign film in China during the first quarter of 2018, ahead of Hollywood films including Black Panther, Pacific Rim: Uprising, Jumanji: Welcome to the Jungle, Tomb Raider, Maze Runner: The Death Cure and Star Wars: The Last Jedi.

Hong Kong 

Critical reception 
 Mike McCahill of The Guardian gave the film a rating of 4 out of 5 stars and praised the film by saying that "This is first-class entertainment, the best imaginable antidote to the toxicity presently leaking out of western movie circles." Meena Iyer of The Times of India gave the film a rating of 4 stars out of 5 and said that, "If your world revolves around your mother, you're going to root for this film."

Rajeev Masand gave the film a rating of 3.5 stars out of 5 describing it as "an inspiring journey towards empowerment, a case for pursuing one's passion against all odds, a testament to the deep mother-daughter bond, and a convincing depiction of teenage years." He praised the performances of the actors with a special mention for the lead actress Zaira Wasim saying "Standing tall amidst a pitch-perfect ensemble, is Zaira Wasim as Insiya, who comes off as something of an old soul trapped in a teenager's body. Wise beyond her years, she is riveting on screen, in the manner in which she appears to sing using her entire being, or the little moments of crushing disappointment and excitement that are reflected on the canvas that is her expressive face."

Saibal Chatterjee of NDTV said Secret Superstar "is a bit like an over-enthusiastic child gifted a new bicycle. It never takes the foot off the pedal. The overlong film could have done with more restraint. It frequently seems to get carried away by the urge not to miss any trick in the book." However, he praised the performances of its actors, saying, "Zaira is an absolute treat—a bundle of miracles! As for the wonderful Meher Vij, one can only ask: where was she all these years? We hope to see more of her on the big screen." He concluded that "Secret Superstar is a winner notwithstanding the bumps along the way." Raja Sen of NDTV gave the film 2.5 out of 5 stars and said, "Aamir Khan has a blast in this sweet and simple film about a young girl who dares to dream."

Rohit Vats of Hindustan Times gave the film a rating of 3 stars out of 5. He highlighted the positive aspects of the film saying that, "Secret Superstars biggest asset is Aamir Khan. His comedy despite being slapstick in nature, is worth noticing. Zaira Wasim lives up to the expectations and the film has a message." and the negative aspect of the film as well saying that, "Secret Superstar has everything you ask for, but it isn't exceptional storytelling. If there is one thing that can be blamed for it, it’s the overt melodrama."

Shubhra Gupta of The Indian Express praised the acting performances and the first half of the movie saying that, "The biggest strength of Secret Superstar is the wonderful Wasim who was also in Dangal. Both Vij as the mother and Arjun as the father are terrific, especially the latter, who doesn't put a foot wrong." but she wasn't impressed with the second half of the film and said that, "The second half slides. The confidence that the narrative shows in the beginning begins to waver as it includes contrivances and predictable curves." She gave the film a rating of 2.5 stars out of 5.

In China, the film also received critical acclaim. Chinese newspaper People's Daily, for example, praised the film for "touching the soul". In Hong Kong, Nicola Chan of South China Morning Post rated the film 4 out of 5 stars. She called it a "crowd-pleaser that explores the sacred mother-daughter bond" and praised the performances of Khan, Wasim and Vij. Richard James Havis of South China Morning Post also rated it 4 out of 5 stars. He called it "a tough story about domestic abuse and female empowerment" and noted "India’s energetic and freewheeling style of cinema can offer a new way of telling a story," such as the "idea of having Insia – who does not usually wear a burka – don the garment to disguise herself when she performs on YouTube is very clever, in the sense it’s a reasonable way for her to solve her problem of anonymity."

Awards and nominations

Impact 
Secret Superstars strong opening in China was helped by Aamir Khan's significant following in the country, along with strong word-of-mouth, influenced by high audience ratings of 9.6 out of 10 on Maoyan and 8.2 out of 10 on Douban. The film was also trending on Chinese social media platforms, including WeChat and Douban, and dominated discussions on Sina Weibo. Along with Khan, audiences also recognised Zaira Wasim from Dangal. The film's strong opening weekend cemented Aamir Khan's status as a superstar in China, and as "a king of the Chinese box office". Aamir Khan's earnings for Secret Superstar from the China box office is estimated to be , higher than what any other Indian actor-producer has ever earned from a film. The film has increased Aamir Khan's China box office total to $346.5million.

The film, along with previous Aamir Khan successes such as Dangal, has driven up the buyout prices of Indian film imports for Chinese distributors. The success of Dangal and Secret Superstar contributed towards Salman Khan's Bajrangi Bhaijaan (2015) securing a wide release in China, along with Irrfan Khan's Hindi Medium (2017) getting a release in the country.

As with previous Aamir Khan films such as 3 Idiots and Dangal, Secret Superstars social themes such as feminism and domestic violence are universal issues that resonated with Chinese audiences, many of whom could relate to the film's themes. According to Maoyan, the film's audiences were about 57% female and 43% male, and the majority were in the 20–34 age group. Secret Superstar has reportedly influenced an increase in Chinese women calling police for help with domestic violence.

Secret Superstar contributed towards the Chinese market's growth in early 2018, along with domestic productions. Secret Superstars gross dwarfed every Hollywood film released in the first two months, including Jumanji: Welcome to the Jungle, Maze Runner: The Death Cure, and Star Wars: The Last Jedi. Secret Superstar also contributed towards China setting the record for the highest-grossing month ever in any territory during February 2018, when Secret Superstar (rather than Hollywood) was the strongest foreign presence among several dominant domestic Chinese New Year productions.

Notes

References

External links 

Secret Superstar at Bollywood Hungama

2017 films
2010s musical drama films
2010s Hindi-language films
Indian musical drama films
Films set in Gujarat
Films set in Mumbai
Films scored by Amit Trivedi
Films shot in Gujarat
2017 drama films